The Festival international du film fantastique de Gérardmer (formerly Fantastic'Arts, from 1994 to 2008) is an international festival of horror and science fiction films which has been held each year since 1994 in Gérardmer in the Vosges, France towards the end of January. It replaced an earlier film festival which was held in Avoriaz (for 20 years from 1973 until 1993).

Originally, it was called "Fantastica", then Fantastic'Arts to stress the artistic as well as the fantastique side of the festival. Each year, several celebrities form a jury to judge the competing films. Some also present their own work, including the writer Bernard Werber, who comes each year to Place du Tilleul at the centre of the town.

Grand Prize

Special Prize (or Panel Prize)

Public Prize

Fantastic Novel Prize

References

External links
  

Fantasy and horror film festivals
Film festivals in France
1994 establishments in France
Film festivals established in 1994
Science fiction film festivals